Florida International University (FIU) is a public research university with its main campus in Miami-Dade County. Founded in 1965, the school opened its doors to students in 1972. FIU has grown to become the third-largest university in Florida and the eighth-largest public university in the United States by enrollment. FIU is a constituent part of the State University System of Florida. In 2021, it was ranked #1 in the Florida Board of Governors performance funding, and had over $246 million in research expenditures.

The university is classified among the Carnegie "R1: Doctoral Universities – Very high research activity". FIU has 11 colleges and more than 40 centers, facilities, labs, and institutes that offer more than 200 programs of study. It has an annual budget of over $1.7 billion and an annual economic impact of over $5 billion. The university is accredited by the Southern Association of Colleges and Schools (SACS).

FIU's intercollegiate sports teams, the FIU Panthers, compete in National Collegiate Athletic Association (NCAA) Division I and the Conference USA (C-USA). FIU's varsity sports teams have won five athletic championships and Panther athletes have won various individual NCAA national championships. Kenneth A. Jessell has served as President of FIU since 2022.

History

In 1943, state senator Ernest 'Cap' Graham (father of future Florida governor and U.S. senator Bob Graham) presented the state legislature with the initial proposal for the establishment of a public university in Miami-Dade County. While his bill did not pass, Graham persisted in presenting his proposal to colleagues, advising them of the county's need for a state university. He felt the establishment of a public university was necessary to serve the city's growing population.

In 1964, Senate Bill 711 was introduced by Florida senator Robert M. Haverfield. It instructed the state Board of Education and the Board of Regents to begin planning for the development of the state university. The bill was signed into law by then-governor W. Haydon Burns in June 1965.

FIU's founding president Charles "Chuck" Perry was appointed by the Board of Regents in July 1969, at which time the institution was named Florida International University. At 32 years old, the new president was the youngest in the history of the State University System and, at the time, the youngest university president in the country. Perry recruited three co-founders, Butler Waugh, Donald McDowell and Nick Sileo. Alvah Chapman, Jr., former Miami Herald publisher and Knight Ridder chairman, used his civic standing and media power to assist the effort. In the 1980s, Chapman became chair of the FIU Foundation Board of Trustees.

The founders located the campus on the site of the original Tamiami Airport (not related to the later Kendall-Tamiami Airport) on the Tamiami Trail (U.S. Route 41) between Southwest 107th and 117th Avenues, just east of where the West Dade Expressway (now the Homestead Extension of Florida's Turnpike) was being planned. The abandoned airport's air traffic control tower became FIU's first building, with Perry's office on the first floor. It originally had no telephones, no drinking water, and no furniture. Perry decided that the tower should never be destroyed, and it remains on campus, where it is now known variously as the "Veterans Office," "Ivory Tower," the "Tower Building," or the "Public Safety Tower," and is the former location of the FIU Police Department.

Groundbreaking for the Tamiami campus was held in January 1971. U Thant received FIU's first honorary degree.

Miami-Dade County's public university

In September 1972, 5,667 students entered the new state university, the largest opening day enrollment at the time. Eighty percent of the student body had just graduated from Dade County Junior College (now Miami-Dade College). A typical student entering FIU was 25 years old and attending school full-time while holding down a full-time job. Forty-three percent were married. Negotiations with the University of Miami and Dade County Junior College led FIU to open as an upper-division only school; Perry's vision foresaw a "no gimmicks" institution with no student housing. It would be nine years before lower-division classes were added.

The first commencement, held in June 1973, took place in the reading room of the ground floor of Primera Casa – the only place large enough on campus for the ceremony. More than 1,500 family members and friends watched FIU's first class of 191 graduates receive their diplomas.

By late 1975, after seven years at the helm, Charles Perry felt he had accomplished his goal and left the university to become president and publisher of the Sunday newspaper magazine Family Weekly (later USA Weekend), one of the country's largest magazines. When he left, there were more than 10,000 students attending classes and a campus with five major buildings and a sixth being planned.

Crosby and Wolfe: 1976–1986

Harold Crosby, the university's second president and the founding president of the University of West Florida in Pensacola, agreed in 1976 to serve a three-year "interim" term. Under his leadership, FIU's North Miami Campus (which was officially renamed the Bay Vista Campus in 1980, the North Miami Campus in 1987, the North Campus in 1994, and the Biscayne Bay Campus in 2000)—located on the former Interama site on Biscayne Bay—was opened in 1977. State senator Jack Gordon was instrumental in securing funding for the development of the campus. President Crosby emphasized the university's international character, prompting the launching of new programs with an international focus and the recruitment of faculty from the Caribbean and Latin America. President Crosby's resignation in January 1979 triggered the search for a "permanent" president.

Gregory Baker Wolfe, a former United States diplomat and then-president of Portland State University, became FIU's third president, serving from 1979 to 1986. During his tenure, the institution continued to grow; it became a four-year institution, though Wolfe was criticized for not hiring enough minorities and for leading a weak private fundraising effort. After stepping down as president, Wolfe taught in the university's international relations department. The student union on the Biscayne Bay Campus is named in his honor.

Maidique presidency and expansion

Modesto A. Maidique assumed the presidency at FIU in 1986, becoming the fourth in the university's history and the first Hispanic leader of any of Florida's state universities. Maidique graduated with a Bachelor of Science, Master of Science, and PhD in Electrical Engineering from Massachusetts Institute of Technology (MIT), before joining the private sector. He held academic appointments from MIT, Harvard and Stanford Universities, and has been named to several US presidential boards and committees.

Under his leadership, FIU heralded in an era of unprecedented growth and prestige, with all facets of the university undergoing major transformations. Physically, the university tripled in size and its enrollment grew to nearly 40,000. During his 23 years as president, the school established the Herbert Wertheim College of Medicine, the FIU College of Law, the FIU School of Architecture, and the Robert Stempel School of Public Health. Also during his tenure, the endowment grew from less than $2 million to over $100 million.

During Maidique's tenure, the university added 22 new doctoral programs. Research expenditures grew from about $6 million to nearly $110 million as defined by the National Science Foundation. In 2000, FIU attained the highest ranking in the Carnegie Foundation classification system, that of "Doctoral/Research University-Extensive." FIU's faculty has engaged in research and holds far-reaching expertise in reducing morbidity and mortality from cancer, HIV/AIDS, substance abuse, diabetes and other diseases, and change the approaches to the delivery of health care by medical, public health, nursing and other healthcare professionals, hurricane mitigation, climate change, nano-technologies, forensic sciences, and the development of biomedical devices.

The arts also flourished while Maidique was at the helm, with the university acquiring The Wolfsonian-FIU Museum on Miami Beach and building the Patricia and Phillip Frost Art Museum on its main campus. In athletics, FIU made inroads in becoming a powerhouse athletic university during Maidique's time as president; he unilaterally changed the mascot from the Sunblazers to the Golden Panthers early in his tenure, and he championed the eventual establishment of an NCAA football program. Finally, the school earned membership into Phi Beta Kappa, the nation's oldest honor society.

Maidique was the second longest-serving research university president in the nation. Now President Emeritus, he currently serves as the Alvah H. Chapman, Jr., Eminent Scholar Chair in Leadership, and Professor of Management at FIU.

Rosenberg presidency

On November 14, 2008, Maidique announced that he would be stepping down and asked FIU's board of trustees to begin the search of a new president. He said he would remain president until a new one was found. On April 25, 2009, Mark B. Rosenberg was selected to become FIU's fifth president. He signed a five-year contract with the board of trustees. On August 29, 2009, Rosenberg became FIU's fifth president.

Having started as a two-year upper division university, FIU has grown into a much larger traditional university and serves international students. More than $600 million has been invested in campus construction, with the addition of new residence halls, the FIU Stadium, recreation center, student center, and Greek life mansions, as well as the fielding of the Division I-A Golden Panthers football team in 2002.

Since 1986, the university established its School of Architecture, College of Law and College of Medicine (named the Herbert Wertheim College of Medicine in 1999 after Herbert Wertheim donated $20 million to the college, which was matched by state funds and is the largest donation in the university's history), and acquired the historic Wolfsonian-FIU Museum in Miami Beach.

FIU now emphasizes research as a major component of its mission and is now classed as a "very high research activity" university under the Carnegie Classification of Institutions of Higher Education. Sponsored research funding (grants and contracts) from external sources for the year 2007–2008 totaled some $110 million. FIU has a budget of over $649 million. The Florida International University School of Hospitality & Tourism Management collaborated with the Ministry of Education of the People's Republic of China to work on preparations for the 2008 Summer Olympics. FIU was the only university in the United States invited to do so.

In December 2013, it was announced Royal Caribbean was building a $20 million 130,000 sq. ft. training facility for its performers at the school. The facility opened in March 2015. The complex serves architecture, art, and hospitality students and includes lighting, set design, marketing, and other internship and training opportunities.

On March 15, 2018, a newly constructed pedestrian bridge collapsed outside the university, resulting in six fatalities. On May 6, 2020, Florida Department of Transportation announced plans to design and rebuild the bridge.

Rosenberg suddenly resigned from the university effective January 21, 2022, citing deteriorating health conditions of his wife. Just a week later it was revealed that he stepped down because he had made aggressive advances to a younger female employee, "causing discomfort," and creating a hostile work environment. Rosenberg is currently a professor of political science and international relations at the Steven J. Green School of International and Public Affairs at FIU.

Jessell Presidency
Rosenberg was succeeded by Kenneth A. Jessell as president, previously FIU's chief financial officer and senior vice president for finance and administration. Jessell was selected as FIU's sixth president on October 17, 2022 by FIU's Board of Trustees and was and was confirmed by the Florida Board of Governors on November 9, 2022.

Campus

Florida International's 344-acre (139 ha) campus is in the census-designated place of Westchester, a suburban residential area in Miami-Dade County. The Modesto A. Maidique Campus ("MMC")—formerly called University Park but renamed in 2009—encompasses . The MMC houses almost all of the university's colleges and schools as well as all the administrative offices and main university facilities. MMC is also home to the Ronald Reagan Presidential House, the home of FIU's president; the Wertheim Performing Arts Center; the Frost Art Museum; the International Hurricane Research Center; and the university's athletic facilities such as FIU Stadium, FIU Arena, and the FIU Baseball Stadium.

The postal address of the Modesto Maidique campus is designated as being of "Miami, Florida" and the ZIP code is 33199, while the campus is physically in the Westchester census-designated place as of the 2020 U.S. Census. In the 1990 U.S. Census it was in the Olympia Heights CDP. In the 2000 U.S. Census and the 2010 U.S. Census this campus was in the University Park CDP.

The site of the campus was originally used for a general aviation airport called Tamiami Airport (not to be confused with Kendall-Tamiami Airport), which was in operation from the 1940s until 1967, when it relocated to a new site. The airport had three runways and was used for pilot training, among other purposes. The original campus was named the Tamiami Campus, after the nearby Tamiami Trail highway and the former airport, until being designated the University Park Campus in 1987.

Until the early 1990s, the runways, parking ramp, and other features of Tamiami Airport were still visible on campus and clearly discernible in aerial photos. Construction has removed all of these features, and only the University Tower remains as a memory of the university's past. University Park is a heavily vegetated campus, with many lakes, a 15-acre nature preserve, and a palm arboretum, with over 90 buildings. As of late 2009, current construction at University Park includes the Nursing and Health Sciences Building, the School of International and Public Affairs Building, and a fifth parking garage.

On June 12, 2009, FIU's Board of Trustees voted unanimously to rename the University Park campus to the Modesto Maidique Campus; the university had considered naming the law school in his honor but decided not to because that would preclude a future charitable donation to name the school. The change created a large backlash from the FIU community, as many felt it unfitting to name the campus after him. A campaign by FIU students and alumni was created to revert the name change, and to keep the name University Park. A Facebook group, "No to Maidique's Campus" with over 2,000 supporters has made national news, in many newspapers, TV news stations, and collegiate magazines, supporting to keep the name "University Park".

Engineering Center
Located five blocks north of Modesto A. Maidique, is the 38-acre (15.3 ha) Engineering Center which houses a part of the College of Engineering and Computing and is the home of FIU's Motorola Nanofabrication Research Facility. The Engineering Center is serviced by the CATS Shuttle, FIU's student buses, which run throughout the day on weekdays connecting the two parts of campus.

Main Modesto A. Maidique buildings

Biscayne Bay Campus

The Biscayne Bay Campus (BBC) in North Miami is Florida International's 200-acre (91 ha) waterfront branch campus. It was opened in 1977 by Harold Crosby and occupies land, directly on the bay and adjacent to the Oleta River State Park, with which FIU has a research partnership. Access to these resources inspired the creation of a marine biology program on the Biscayne Bay Campus, which has become one of the university's most recognized programs. The Biscayne Bay Campus also houses the School of Hospitality & Tourism Management, the School of Journalism and Mass Communication, the Aquatic Center, and the Kovens Conference Center. The Golden Panther Express, FIU's student buses, connect the main campus and the Biscayne Bay Campus throughout the day on weekdays.

On the Biscayne Bay Campus, FIU offers housing through Bayview Student Living apartments. BBC's first on-campus new housing in 30+ years houses 408 students in a high rise overlooking Biscayne Bay. . Through FIU's Panther Express Shuttle, current students travel free between campuses.

Regional centers
FIU also has other smaller regional centers located throughout South Florida in both Miami-Dade County and Broward County, serving the local communities in research, continuing studies, and in culture. In Miami-Dade County, there are four regional FIU facilities, the Downtown Miami Center, the Wolfsonian-FIU Museum in Miami Beach (Washington Avenue and 10th St), the FIU-Florida Memorial research center in Miami Gardens, and a research site in Homestead.

FIU at I-75
The FIU at I-75 academic center is a satellite campus located in Miramar, which borders Pembroke Pines and the southernmost portion of Interstate 75 in Broward County. It finished construction in 2014 and is used to satisfy overwhelming demand from Broward County students. The campus houses an 89,000-sqft. complex that offers programs offers courses and program from within the College of Arts & Sciences, College of Business, College of Education, and the College of Engineering & Computing. This campus is also equipped with offices, a computer lab, student lounges, and study spaces for students.

Downtown Miami Center

FIU has a center on Brickell Avenue in Downtown Miami at 1101 Brickell Avenue dubbed "FIU Downtown on Brickell". FIU's College of Business Administration has had classes at the Burdines Building on Flagler Street and the Metropolitan Center had offices at 150 SE 2nd Ave since 2004. In August 2011, FIU expanded its Downtown center to 1101 Brickell with the expansion of course offerings for the College of Business Administration and the School of International and Public Affairs, as well as with FIU's research center, the Metropolitan Center. Most programs in Downtown are graduate-level evening courses geared for Downtown professionals and residents. As of Spring 2011, there were approximately 500 students enrolled at the Downtown center, with plans to grow the center to over 2,000 students by 2021.

Organization and administration

FIU belongs to the 12-campus State University System of Florida and is one of Florida's primary graduate research universities, awarding over 3,400 graduate and professional degrees annually. The university offers 191 programs of study with more than 280 majors in 23 colleges and schools. FIU offers many graduate programs, including architecture, business administration, engineering, law, and medicine, offering 81 master's degrees, 34 doctoral degrees, and 3 professional degrees.

Student government
The Student Government Association presides over and funds the over 300 student clubs and organizations and honor societies at the university and has an operating budget of over $14 million. The Student Government Association is split into three branches, with the Executive, a Legislative Student Senate, and Judicial Supreme Court. The president of Modesto  serves as the student representative on the FIU Board of Trustees, while the vice president serves as a member of the FIU Foundation Board of Directors.

The Student Government contains five separate governing councils- the Student Programming Council, the Council for Student Organizations, which represents the over 200 or more student clubs and organizations, the Homecoming Council, Black Student Union, and Panther Power, the student spirit group. The Panther Power group can be seen in all Golden Panthers athletic events along with the Golden Panthers Band, the Golden Dazzlers dance team and the Golden Panthers cheerleaders.

Presidents

Academics

FIU offers 191 academic programs, 60 baccalaureate programs, 81 master's programs, 3 specialist programs, 34 doctoral programs, and 4 professional programs in 23 colleges and schools. In addition, 97% of the faculty have terminal degrees, and 50% currently have tenure at the university with a student/teacher ratio of 27:1.

In the early 2000s (decade), emphasis at FIU was placed on growth in degree programs and student enrollment. Since 2005 however, student enrollment has been capped and emphasis became placed on improving the quality of the existing academic programs. With the addition of the College of Medicine, the demand for facilities and classroom space has greatly increased.

Tuition
For the 2019–2020 academic year, tuition costs are:
 Undergraduate  $205.57 per credit hour for in-state students, and $618.87 per credit hour for out-of-state students. Total tuition/fees :$7,916 for in-state and $20,314 for out of state
 Graduate  $455.64 per credit hour for in-state students, and $1,001.69 per credit hour for out-of-state students. Total tuition/fees :$9,600 for in-state and $19,428 for out of state
 Law School (day)  $675.67 per credit hour for in-state students, and $1,101.87 per credit hour for out-of-state students. Total tuition/fees:$20,660 for in-state and $33,446 for out of state
 Law School (night)  $506.77 per credit hour for in-state students, and $851.40 per credit hour for out-of-state students. Total tuition/fees:$15,593 for in-state and $25,932 for out of state

Admissions

Florida International University students, numbering 56,592 in Fall 2021, come from more than 130 countries, and all 50 U.S. states. The ratio of women to men is 57:43, and 28.9 percent are graduate and professional students. Professional degree programs include Law, Medicine, Engineering, Business Administration, and Nursing.

The Fall 2021 incoming freshman class had an average 4.34 GPA, 1338 SAT score, and a 28.66 ACT score. The freshman retention rate for 2021 was 100%. The most popular College by enrollment is the College of Arts and Sciences.

For Fall 2021, 24,351 students applied for graduate admissions throughout the university. Of those, 8,043 (33.02%) were accepted. The Wertheim College of Medicine admitted 5.1% of its applicants, and the College of Law admitted 22%. Admission to the Wertheim College of Medicine is competitive, and the college has one of the highest number of applicants in the state, greater than the University of Florida. For Fall 2010, 3,606 students applied for 43 spots.

The FIU School of Architecture is the most competitive in Florida, with the lowest admission rate in the state at 14% (2011). For Fall 2009, the School of Architecture received over 1,000 applications for the first-year Master of Architecture program, with 60 being accepted, giving the School of Architecture a 6% admissions rate. The average high school GPA for the freshman class in the School of Architecture was 3.98, also making it one of the most selective schools at FIU.

Enrollment

Total enrollment in Fall 2022 was 55,687 students, with 45,442 being undergraduate students and 10,245 being graduate students.

In 2018, 4.68% of FIU students were recognized as international students. Of those, the most popular countries of origin were: Venezuela (17.1%), China (11.7%), Kuwait (7.4%), India (5.1%), Brazil (4.4%), and Colombia (3.3%). In total, 2,738 international students enrolled at Florida International University.

Students from New York, New Jersey, and California make up the largest states for out-of-state students. Floridians make up 90% of the student population. Miami-Dade, Broward, Palm Beach, Hillsborough, and Orange County make up the largest Florida counties for in-state students.

University Park accounted for 87% of the student population and 94% of housing students. The Biscayne Bay Campus accounted for about 13% of the student population, mostly of lower-division undergraduates and students of the School of Hospitality & Tourism Management. According to U.S. News college rankings and reviews, 92% of FIU students live off-campus, while 8% of students live in "college-owned, college-operated or college-affiliated" housing.

Rankings

For 2023, U.S. News & World Report ranked Florida International University as the 72nd best public university in the United States, and 162th overall among all national universities, public and private.

For 2022, U.S. News & World Report ranked Florida International University as the 34th most innovative university in the United States. This ranking is determined by the top-ranked schools that are making the most innovative improvements in terms of curriculum, campus life, technology, and facilities.

For 2023, U.S. News & World Report ranked Florida International University as the 4th best university in the United States for Social Mobility. This ranking was determined by which colleges are more successful than others at advancing social mobility by enrolling and graduating large proportions of disadvantaged students awarded with Pell Grants.

For 2022, U.S. News & World Report ranked Florida International University as the 99th best university in the United States for Veterans. This ranking is determined by the top-ranked schools that participate in federal initiatives helping veterans and active-duty service members pay for their degrees.

For 2022, U.S. News & World Report ranked Florida International University as the 121st best value university in the United States. The calculation used here takes into account a school's academic quality level versus the net cost of attendance for a student who received the average level of need-based financial aid.

In 2018, Diverse: Issues In Higher Education ranked FIU first in granting bachelor's degrees, seventh in granting master's degrees, and 27th in granting doctoral degrees to minorities in the United States.

In 2013, U.S. News & World Report reported that FIU students are among the least indebted college students in the nation, and recognized the university as a "best buy" in higher education. The organization also reported FIU for having one of the safest campus in the United States.

In 2010, FIU was listed as one of 16 universities with the toughest grading system nationally.

In 2000, FIU became the youngest university to be awarded a Phi Beta Kappa chapter, the country's oldest and most distinguished academic honor society. FIU is one of only 78 universities nationwide to hold both designations.

The Journal of Criminal Justice ranks the Criminal Justice program tenth in the U.S. (November 2007).

Faculty of the PhD program in social welfare rank fourth in the United States in their scholarly accomplishment, according to Academic Analytics in 2007.

College of Business
The College of Business is accredited by the AACSB International – the Association to Advance Collegiate Schools of Business.

U.S. News & World Reports "America's Best Colleges" (2015) ranks the undergraduate international business program sixth in the nation. It 2015, it ranked the Chapman Graduate School of Business 15th in the nation for an International MBA. FIU is also the only university in Florida to be ranked in the top 15 for undergraduate international business. Bloomberg Businessweek ranked the Landon Undergraduate School of Business in 2012, 11th in Operations Management, and 99th for Accounting. América Economía ranks the Chapman Graduate School of Business 48th for an International MBA.

The Financial Times (2008) ranks the Executive MBA in the top 35 among U.S. Executive MBAs.

Hispanic Business (since 1998) and Hispanic Trends (since 2003) have placed the College of Business among the top 25 business schools for Hispanics. In 2008, it was ranked #8. Fortune Small Business recognized the college as among the best in the United States for entrepreneurship in its listing of "America's Best Colleges for Entrepreneurs," (August 2007), in the "Cross-Disciplinary/Cross Pollination" category. Hispanic Trends ranks the Executive MBA program eighth in its list of the best Executive MBA programs for Hispanics. QS in 2015 ranked FIU's MBA program 58th in North America.

College of Law
The College of Law is currently 88th in the U.S. News & World Report's law school rankings, having risen steadily from 132nd when first ranked. In 2010, the FIU College of Law was ranked among the Top 10 Best Value schools by The National Jurist. The Best Value rating was based on three criteria: bar passage rate, average indebtedness after graduation, and employment nine months after graduation. The FIU College of Law was also ranked third amongst Florida schools for the scholarly impact of its faculty, behind University of Florida and Florida State University. According to the Leiter Rankings, the College of Law has already made a scholarly impact that dramatically outpaces its academic reputation.

FIU graduates achieved the highest passage rate among all Florida law schools on the July 2015, February 2016, and July 2016 exams. In 2007, the College of Law was ranked first in Florida in the Multistate Professional Responsibility Exam at 96%. In July 2008, the College of Law achieved a 90.6% passing rate, which placed it second among Florida's ten law schools. In February 2009, the College of Law achieved an 81.5% passing rate, which placed it first among Florida's ten law schools.

On July 1, 2009, Alex Acosta, after leaving the post of United States Attorney (USAG) for South Florida, became FIU's second dean of its law school. He departed FIU to become the United States Secretary of Labor in 2017. In 2019, he stepped down as Labor Secretary after scrutiny of his role as USAG in the minimal sentencing of convicted child sex offender Jeffrey Epstein.

Honors College

Florida International University has a nationally recognized honors program. The FIU Honors College supports the university's long tradition of academic excellence by offering research support, honors housing, library privileges, special scholarships, internships, and study abroad opportunities. The Honors College also has pipeline programs with multiple professional and graduate schools. These programs provide students an
opportunity to know by the end of the sophomore year whether they will be accepted into the program of their choice. The Herbert Wertheim College of Medicine, FIU College of Law, FIU College of Engineering and Computing Biomedical Engineering Ph.D., and the Lake Erie College of Medicine's Dentistry, Pharmacy, or Osteopathic Medicine departments have early assurance programs with the FIU Honors College.

Admission into the University Honors Program is selective and in the fall term only. The average academic profile of students that were accepted into honors in 2019 was as follows: 4.4 weighted GPA; 29 ACT composite; 1329 SAT total. The Honors program offers students housing in Parkview Hall which is a living-learning community. Parkview Hall is the traditional home of Honors students since it was completed in 2013, which is situated at the geographic heart of FIU's main campus.

International programs

Florida International University's Education Abroad program (FIU EA) has an international presence in Europe, Asia, and Latin America. Every year FIU consistently sends over 1,000 students across the world to study in multiple locations. As a student of EA, students are able to take classes that meet their major and/or minor requirements, study with experts in their field, and earn FIU credit. In addition, the university has exchange agreements with over 70 partner institutions.

In Italy, FIU's presence is centered in the Genoa area. The Wolfsonian-FIU Museum has a regional facility in the Nervi area, and the School of Architecture has facilities in Genoa for FIU's upper-division and graduate architecture students.

In 2006, FIU opened the Florida International University Tianjin Center in China, from which a branch of the School of Hospitality & Tourism Management operates. The Tianjin Center was constructed as a cooperative venture with the local municipal government. It temporarily closed in 2020 due to the COVID-19 pandemic.

While FIU does not have a campus in Colombia, its extensive involvement in efforts in that country—including river conservation, public health, and justice reform—led the university to designate it one of its "World Centers".

Model United Nations Program
The FIU Model United Nations Program is a program of the School of International and Public Affairs. Each year anywhere between 40 and 80 delegates participate in FIU MUN. FIU MUN is ranked as the first best Model UN Team in North America for the 2018–2019 season.

FIU MUN also hosts an annual high school conference: Florida International Model United Nations (FIMUN). The conference traditionally hosts over 500 high school students.

FIU Libraries

FIU has six libraries, Green Library, FIU's main library; the Glenn Hubert Library (Biscayne Bay Campus), the Wolfsonian Library, the Engineering Library, the Law Library, and the Medical Library. The Green Library, Hubert Library, and Engineering Library Service Center are under the direction of the Dean of University Libraries. Other libraries are overseen by their appropriate schools or organizations.

Together, the entire FIU university-wide Library holdings include over 2,097,207 volumes, 52,511 current serials, 3,587,663 microform units, and 163,715 audio visual units.

Libraries
The Green Library is FIU's main library, is the largest building on campus. Originally designed by Architect David M. Harper in 1973, the Green Library was expanded by the architecture firm M. C. Harry & Associates, Inc. in the early 1990s to its current eight floors, with a capacity to expand to a total of 15 floors, if necessary. The eight-floor structure was built over, through, and around the original three-story library while it was still in use.

The first floor has classrooms, auditorium spaces, and support services for students, such as tutoring, the writing center, and technology assistance. Also on the first floor is an Auntie Anne's and a Starbucks. The second floor has the reference section, cartography (GIS Center), circulation, and numerous computer and printing labs. The third floor is the home of the Medical Library, and includes study lounges as well as a resource center for students of the Honors College. The fourth floor houses the special collections department and university archives. The fifth floor is the home of the School of Architecture Library, as well as the music and audiovisual collections. The sixth and seventh floors are strictly quiet floors, and contain the general book collection along with numerous student study lounges. The eighth floor contains the library's administration offices and technical services departments.

The FIU Engineering Library is located on the second floor of the main building of the Engineering Center.

The FIU Law Library opened in 2002, and has three floors, with all three holding the library's general collection. The third floor has a two-story, quiet reading room, as well as numerous study lounges. Although the Law Library is restricted to Law students, other students may use the library for research purposes.

The FIU Medical Library opened in August 2009 at the same time as the opening of the Herbert Wertheim College of Medicine. The Medical Library offers a rich array of resources, services, and instructional support to advance the teaching and learning, discovery, and healthcare programs of the Herbert Wertheim College of Medicine and is currently located on the third floor of Green Library building. Future construction of buildings for the College of Medicine will include a new space for the Medical Library outside of Green Library, based upon funding and space availability.

The Glenn Hubert Library, previously named the Biscayne Bay Library, is a smaller three-story structure serving the Biscayne Bay Campus. All services at the Green Library are available in the Hubert Library.

The Wolfsonian Library is located at the Wolfsonian-FIU Museum in South Beach, on the corner of Washington Avenue and 10th Street. The collection focuses exclusively on architecture, art, design, and history of the Western World from 1885 to 1945. The library serves mostly as a research library with an extensive collection of primary sources.

Research

Florida International University spent $246 million in annual research expenditures and was awarded $310 million in research awards for fiscal year 2021. Florida International University ranked 107th in total research and development (R&D) expenditures by the National Science Foundation. FIU is classified as a top-tier Doctoral University – Very high research activity by the Carnegie Foundation for the Advancement of Teaching.

International Hurricane Research Center
The International Hurricane Research Center (IHRC) is the nation's only university-based research facility dedicated tropical storm research. It comprises the Laboratory for Coastal Research; the Laboratory for Social Science Research; the Laboratory for Insurance, Financial & Economic Research; and the Laboratory for Wind Engineering Research, as well as the FIU Wall of Wind. The 12-fan Wall of Wind (WoW) at FIU is the largest and most powerful university research facility of its kind and is capable of simulating a Category 5 hurricane. In 2015 the National Science Foundation selected the 12-fan WOW as one of the nation's major "Experimental Facilities" under the Natural Hazards Engineering Research Infrastructure (NHERI) competition. Not to be confused with the National Hurricane Center (also located at University Park), the IHRC is located on the western side of the campus.

Student life

Traditions

FIU has many traditions from student spirit groups, alumni association events, and student spirit events. Incoming students can attend Panther Camp, originally a weekend retreat in the summer and now a two-day on-campus event, which began in 2006. Week of Welcome, usually held the first or second week of the fall semester, holds many spirit events, such as Trail of the Torch, when the torch of knowledge in front of the Primera Casa building is lit on campus.

Residential life

Florida International University's student housing facilities are managed by the Office of Housing and Residential Life located on the Modesto Maidique Campus (MMC). There are 3,300 students living on campus throughout 10 apartment buildings and 6 residence halls. Students reside in the following buildings: University Apartments, Panther Hall, University Towers, Everglades Hall, Lakeview Hall North, Lakeview Hall South, Honors College @ Parkview Hall, and Tamiami Hall. All rooms are suite style or apartment style and none of the buildings have community bathrooms.

On the Biscayne Bay Campus (BBC), FIU offers housing through Bayview Student Living apartments. BBC's first on-campus new housing in 30+ years houses 408 students in a high rise overlooking Biscayne Bay. Through FIU's Panther Express Shuttle, current students travel free between campuses.

The Office of Housing and Residential Life also offers optional communities in the residence halls known as Living Learning Communities (LLCs). These communities offer residents the opportunity to live with individuals of the same major or interest; including, Business, Changemakers, Engineering, Global Engagement, and Honors Place for Honors College students.

Arts and culture

FIU has three museums, the Frost Art Museum, the Wolfsonian-FIU Museum and the Jewish Museum of Florida. The Frost Art Museum is located on Modesto A. Maidique campus and was opened in 1977 as The Art Museum at Florida International University. The Frost Art Museum's Permanent Collection consists of a broad array of art objects from ancient cultural artifacts to contemporary works of art. The Wolfsonian-FIU Museum is located in Miami Beach and promotes the collection, preservation and understanding of decorative art and design from the period from 1885 to 1945. FIU also has a large sculpture collection, named the Sculpture Park at FIU, with sculptures from such prominent artists as Anthony Caro, Jacques Lipchitz, Daniel Joseph Martinez, and Tony Rosenthal. Many different art structures, statues, paintings and mosaics can be seen throughout campus in gardens, buildings, walkways, and on walls.

The School of Music presents an annual series of concerts in a variety of genres, as well as learning facilities and opportunities for musicians. The concert season incorporates music of all styles including jazz, early music, chamber music, choral/vocal, contemporary music, wind, and opera theater performed by world class musicians and ensembles. Many masterclasses and lectures are also open to the public and offered at no charge. The season runs from August through April each year.

The Department Theatre presents a season of four professionally designed, produced and directed productions each year that serve as a laboratory for students. its Main Stage season is presented at the Herbert and Nicole Wertheim Performing Arts Center. In addition to Main Stage productions students write, direct and perform productions in the Student Theatre Lab Studio, the annual New Plays Festival, and the summer Alternative Theatre Festival. The summer Alternative Theatre Festival includes a development project of a new work by an established playwright, a faculty directed piece, one student directed piece, and may include Alumni showcase and reunion productions.

The Florida International University School of Hospitality & Tourism Managementhosts the Annual Food Network South Beach Wine & Food Festival in South Beach, a major national culinary event.

Order of the Torch
The Order of the Torch is a semi-secret honorary leadership society akin to other secret societies in the state such as Florida Blue Key at the University of Florida and the Iron Arrow Honor Society at the University of Miami. The organization is rumored to have been founded in 2003 as a way of organizing student leadership to restructure student life to mirror that of a traditional university. Members now include students, faculty, staff and community members, including FIU alumni Miami-Dade County Mayor Carlos Alvarez (class of 1974). Top leadership in Student Government, Homecoming, and the most elite campus fraternal organizations rank among its members.

Greek life
Approximately 1,100 undergraduate students ( or approximately 2%) are members of either a fraternity or sorority. The Office of Fraternity and Sorority Life at Florida International University is separated into four divisions: Interfraternity Council (IFC), National Panhellenic Conference (NPC), Multicultural Greek Council (MGC), and the National Pan-Hellenic Council (NPHC). The Order of Omega, a Greek honor society, has had a chapter at the university since 1991 and represents the academic top three percent of FIU Greeks.

The Interfraternity Council (IFC) comprises 12 fraternities, and the Panhellenic Council is made up of 7 sororities.

The Multicultural Greek Council consists of 7 cultural organizations (Latino, Asian, South Asian, etc.), three fraternities and four sororities. The National Pan-Hellenic Council comprises nine historically black organizations, five fraternities and four sororities.

There are 29 Academic Honor Societies as well Greek service organizations for students such as Phi Delta Epsilon.

In December 2017, Greek life activities were temporarily paused by the university in the wake of a series of hazing events nationally and the discovery of a group chat of Tau Kappa Epsilon members that contained photos of nude women. TKE and two other institutions, Phi Gamma Delta ("Fiji") and Pi Kappa Phi, were suspended when the university allowed fraternities and sororities to resume. FIU obtained the property of the Greek houses occupied by the latter two fraternities, the only such houses on campus.

Campus and area transportation

The main campus is located on the south side of the Tamiami Trail (U.S. Route 41/SW 8th Street) between SW 107th and SW 117th Avenue next to Florida's Turnpike and near the western terminus of the Dolphin Expressway.

Miami-Dade Transit serves University Park with Metrobus lines 8, 11, 24, and 71. Metrobus lines 75 and 135 serve the Biscayne Bay Campus. Bus lines 8, 11 and the 24 directly connect FIU with Downtown Miami.

Two distinct FIU-operated bus lines are available. The CATS Shuttle runs between University Park and the Engineering Center, and the Golden Panther Express, from University Park to the Biscayne Bay Campus. The CATS Shuttle connects University Park from the Graham Center bus stop and the Engineering and Computer Sciences Building, to the Engineering Center on Flagler Street and 107th Avenue.

There has long been plans for Metrorail, the local heavy rail rapid transit system to be extended west, with two proposed lines terminating at Florida International University's main campus. This would ease traffic and parking problems at and around the main campus.

Student media

FIU Student Media includes PantherNOW, the student newspaper and its accompanying website, and FIU's radio station, WRGP.

PantherNOW is the FIU student newspaper, founded in 1972 and having printed under various titles. PantherNOW is published in print form monthly and also maintains a website, PantherNOW.com. WRGP "The Roar", with antecedents dating to 1988 and broadcasting on FM since 1999, is FIU's student-run radio station, with transmitters in Homestead and on the Maidique and Biscayne Bay campuses.

In television and entertainment
FIU's campus has been the set for many films, television shows, and music videos. One of the earliest television shows to have filmed at FIU was Miami Vice; an episode partially filmed in the then-brand-new Sunblazer Arena was recorded in 1986, just after its opening. The TV show Burn Notice has also filmed various episodes at FIU, with scenes at the College of Business Buildings and the Diaz-Balart College of Law Building. In 2007, Chris Brown filmed the music video for his song "Kiss Kiss" at FIU, with scenes near the Frost Art Museum and around the Graham Center. Various telenovelas for Telemundo and Univision have filmed television episodes at FIU as well. In 2007, Telemundo's Pecados Ajenos was filmed in the Graham Center.

In 2004, MTV's Campus Invasion Tour was held at FIU, bringing numerous bands such as Hoobastank to FIU.

In 2009, TLC's What Not to Wear filmed an episode on campus at the Management and Advanced Research Center. In October 2009, former CNN news anchor Rick Sanchez broadcast his CNN show from the Graham Center at FIU. Three years later, in 2012, G4TV held the Northeast and Southeast regional qualifying rounds of the television show American Ninja Warrior at FIU. The competition took place in the traffic loop between the School of Architecture and the College of Business. Three years after that, in 2015, Florida International University hosted the Miss Universe 2014 pageant in the FIU Arena.

Athletics

Florida International University has seventeen varsity sports teams, named the Panthers. The athletic colors for the Panthers are blue and gold, and they compete in the NCAA Division I as part of Conference USA in all sports. Three main sports facilities serve as home venues for Panther athletics. The Panthers football team plays at Riccardo Silva Stadium ("The Cage"), the men and women's basketball and volleyball teams play at the Ocean Bank Convocation Center, and the men's baseball team plays at Infinity Insurance Park. Other athletics venues include the Aquatic Center, Tennis Complex, softball fields, and various other recreational fields. On July 1, 2013, FIU became a member of Conference USA.

Traditional rivals of the FIU Panthers include Florida Atlantic University and the University of Miami. The Panthers football team competes in the Shula Bowl, an annual football game played for the Don Shula Award against in-state rival Florida Atlantic University. Due to this competition, the rivalry between the two schools has grown, with the rivalry extending into the men's baseball and basketball teams as well.

The Panthers football team plays home games at Riccardo Silva Stadium, nicknamed "The Cage", and are currently coached by Mike MacIntyre. In 2005, the Panthers moved to the Sun Belt Conference, making their transition from Division I-FCS to Division I-FBS complete. In their first season in the conference, the Panthers began by finishing 5–6. The football program has one conference title to date—in 2010, when it won the Sun Belt Conference title and played in the Little Caesars Pizza Bowl against Toledo, winning late in the fourth quarter.

The FIU men's basketball team has one NCAA tournament appearance to its record. Currently coached by Jeremy Ballard, past coaches include Isiah Thomas and Richard Pitino.

FIU's athletics department has produced many professional and Olympic athletes, including current players in Major League Baseball, Major League Soccer, National Basketball Association, National Football League and the Women's National Basketball Association. Notable alumni include Mike Lowell, Raja Bell, Carlos Arroyo, and Tayna Lawrence.

Notable alumni
 

FIU currently has over 275,000 alumni around the world in more than 138 countries. FIU graduates more than 10,000 students a year. Alumni services is run by the Florida International University Alumni Association, which sponsors numerous alumni events, galas, and ceremonies annually.

See also

Notes

References

External links

 
 Florida International University Athletics website

 
1965 establishments in Florida
Educational institutions established in 1965
Public universities and colleges in Florida
Universities and colleges accredited by the Southern Association of Colleges and Schools
Universities and colleges in Broward County, Florida
Universities and colleges in Miami-Dade County, Florida
Westchester, Florida